Music from the Motion Picture Trespass is the original soundtrack to Walter Hill's 1992 film Trespass. It was released in 1992 via Sire Records and Warner Bros. Records. It is composed of twelve hip hop tracks from various rappers and producers. The title track was performed by two actors from the film, Ice Cube and Ice-T. The album has peaked at number 82 on the Billboard 200.

Reception

"Tagged on at the end is a single track by Ry Cooder… a piece which suggests Cooder's main claim to gangsta cred is a readiness to take the loot and run," remarked David Sinclair in a 3/5 review in Q. "Despite some excellently menacing beats – especially the Ice-T/Daddy Nitro duet 'Depths of Hell' – the album is let down over the distance by its numbingly repetitive language and one-track theme".

Track listing

Personnel 

Lloyd "Mooseman" Roberts III – bass (track 3)
Nathan East – bass (track 12)
Jon Hassell – trumpet (track 12)
Bob Morse – engineering (track 1)
Anthony "Sir Jinx" Wheaton – mixing (track 1)
Robert "Void" Caprio – engineering (track 2)
Mike Bona – mixing (track 2)
Tony Pizarro – engineering & mixing (track 3)
Anthony Ray – engineering & mixing (track 4)
Sean Freehill – engineering (track 5)
Joe McGrath – mixing (track 5)
Lisle Leete – engineering & mixing (track 6)
Courtney Branch – engineering & mixing (track 7)
Tracy Kendrick – engineering & mixing (track 7)
Eddie Sancho – engineering (track 8)
Christopher Edward Martin – mixing (track 8)
Keith Edward Elam – mixing (track 8)
John Quinde – engineering & mixing (track 9)
Luc Allen – engineering & mixing (track 9)
Mike Hightower – engineering (track 10)
Bilal Bashir – mixing (track 10)
Donald Lamont – mixing (track 10)
Mike Melnick – engineering & mixing (track 11)
Allen Sides – engineering & mixing (track 12)
Brian Knapp Gardner – mastering
Jorge Hinojosa – executive producer
Sharon Boyle – executive producer
Dirk Walter – art direction
Katherine Delaney – design

See also
Trespass (film score)

References

External links 

1992 soundtrack albums
Hip hop soundtracks
Gangsta rap soundtracks
Albums produced by DJ Aladdin
Albums produced by DJ Premier
Albums produced by Lord Finesse
Albums produced by Courtney Branch
Albums produced by Battlecat (producer)
Thriller film soundtracks
Crime film soundtracks